Heely Creek is a stream in the U.S. state of South Dakota.

Heely Creek has the name of Frank Heely, a local cattleman.

See also
List of rivers of South Dakota

References

Rivers of Pennington County, South Dakota
Rivers of South Dakota